Chandra Kant Sathe (31 October 1947 – 3 August 2017) was an Indian cricket umpire. He stood in five ODI games between 1993 and 2000.

See also
 List of One Day International cricket umpires

References

1947 births
2017 deaths
Indian One Day International cricket umpires
Cricketers from Pune